Lennart Wass (born 4 January 1953) is a Swedish football manager and former player. He co-managed Swedish side Djurgårdens IF along with Carlos Banda during the 2010 Allsvenskan and the beginning of the 2011 Allsvenskan.

References

1953 births
Living people
Swedish footballers
Swedish football managers
Djurgårdens IF Fotboll managers
Association footballers not categorized by position
Footballers from Stockholm